The San Fernando Stakes is an American Thoroughbred horse race held annually in mid January at Santa Anita Park in Arcadia, California. Open to four-year-old horses, it is contested on at a distance of  miles (8.5 furlongs) on Pro-Ride synthetic dirt. In 2011, Santa Anita returned to dirt racing.

First run in 1952, the San Fernando Stakes is the second leg of Santa Anita Park's Strub Series.

The race was contested at  miles from 1960 to 1997. It was run in two divisions in 1964, 1975, and 1977.

Records
Speed record:
 1:40.16 – Air Command (2008) (at current distance of  miles)
 1:46.60 – In Excess (at previous distance of  miles)

Most wins by a jockey:
 8 – Bill Shoemaker (1955, 1957, 1958, 1961, 1964, 1968, 1975, 1980)

Most wins by a trainer:
 5 – Bob Baffert (1998, 2004, 2008, 2011, 2013)

Most wins by an owner:
 2 – Gedney Farms (1964, 1977)
 2 – Maxwell Gluck's Elmendorf Farm
 2 – Jack Kent Cooke (1990, 1994)

Winners

 † In 1977, Properantes won the 1st division of the race but was disqualified from first to second.
 In 1972 there was a Dead heat for first.

References
 The 2009 San Fernando Stakes at the NTRA

Horse races in California
Santa Anita Park
Graded stakes races in the United States
Open mile category horse races
Horse races established in 1952